Tethya is a genus of  sea sponges belonging to the family Tethyidae. Members of this genus all have a spherical body form and some are known to be able to move at speeds of between 1 and 4 mm per day.

Species
The following species are recognised in the genus Tethya:
 Tethya actinia de Laubenfels, 1950
 Tethya acuta Sarà & Sarà, 2004
 Tethya amplexa Bergquist & Kelly-Borges, 1991
 Tethya andamanensis Dendy & Burton, 1926
 Tethya asbestella Lamarck, 1815
 Tethya aurantium (Pallas, 1766)
 Tethya beatrizae Ribeiro & Muricy, 2011
 Tethya bergquistae Hooper, 1994
 Tethya bitylastra Mácola & Menegola, 2018
 Tethya boeroi Sarà, 1992
 Tethya brasiliana Ribeiro & Muricy, 2004
 Tethya bullae Bergquist & Kelly-Borges, 1991
 Tethya burtoni Sarà & Sarà, 2004
 Tethya californiana de Laubenfels, 1932
 Tethya citrina Sarà & Melone, 1965
 Tethya coccinea Bergquist & Kelly-Borges, 1991
 Tethya communis Bergquist & Kelly-Borges, 1991
 Tethya comorensis Sarà, Corriero & Bavestrello, 1993
 Tethya compacta Bergquist, 1961
 Tethya cyanae Ribeiro & Muricy, 2004
 Tethya deformis Thiele, 1898
 Tethya dendyi Sarà & Sarà, 2004
 Tethya densa Sarà, 1992
 Tethya diploderma Schmidt, 1870
 Tethya ensis Sarà, Gómez & Sarà, 2001
 Tethya expansa Sarà & Sarà, 2004
 Tethya fastigiata Bergquist & Kelly-Borges, 1991
 Tethya fissurata Lendenfeld, 1888
 Tethya flexuosa Sarà & Sarà, 2004
 Tethya gigantea (Lendenfeld, 1888)
 Tethya globostellata Lendenfeld, 1897
 Tethya globum Duchassaing & Michelotti, 1864
 Tethya gracilis Sarà, Sarà, Nickel & Brümmer, 2001
 Tethya gunni Sarà & Sarà, 2004
 Tethya hibernica Heim, Nickel, Picton & Brümmer, 2007
 Tethya hooperi Sarà & Sarà, 2004
 Tethya ignis Ribeiro & Muricy, 2004
 Tethya ingalli Bowerbank, 1858
 Tethya irisae Sorokin, Ekins, Yang & Cárdenas, 2019
 Tethya irregularis Sarà & Bavestrello, 1998
 Tethya japonica Sollas, 1888
 Tethya laevis (Lendenfeld, 1888)
 Tethya levii Sarà, 1988
 Tethya leysae Heim & Nickel, 2010
 †Tethya logani Dawson, 1857
 Tethya magna Kirkpatrick, 1903
 Tethya maza Selenka, 1879
Tethya melinka Hajdu, Desqueyroux-Faúndez, Carvalho, Lôbo-Hajdu & Willenz, 2013
Tethya meloni Corriero, Gadaleta & Bavestrello, 2015
 Tethya mexicana Sarà, Gómez & Sarà, 2001
 Tethya microstella Sarà, 1990
 Tethya minuta Sarà, Sarà, Nickel & Brümmer, 2001
 Tethya monstrosa (Burton, 1924)
 Tethya mortoni Bergquist & Kelly-Borges, 1991
 Tethya multifida (Carter, 1882)
 Tethya multistella Lendenfeld, 1888
 Tethya nicolae Ribeiro & Muricy, 2011
 Tethya norvegica Bowerbank, 1872
 Tethya novaecaledoniae Sarà, 1988
 Tethya nux (Selenka, 1867)
 Tethya omanensis Sarà & Bavestrello, 1995
 Tethya ornata Sarà, Bavestrello & Calcinai, 2000
 Tethya orphei Sarà, 1990
 Tethya ovum Sarà, Gómez & Sarà, 2001
 Tethya papillosa (Thiele, 1905)
 Tethya paroxeata Sarà, Gómez & Sarà, 2001
 Tethya parvistella (Baer, 1906)
 Tethya parvula Ribeiro & Muricy, 2011
 Tethya pellis Bergquist & Kelly-Borges, 1991
 Tethya peracuata (Topsent, 1918)
 Tethya popae Bergquist & Kelly-Borges, 1991
 Tethya pulchra Sarà, 1992
 Tethya pulitzeri Sarà & Sarà, 2004
 Tethya robusta (Bowerbank, 1873)
 Tethya rubra Samaai & Gibbons, 2005
 Tethya samaaii Ribeiro & Muricy, 2011
 Tethya sarai Desqueyroux-Faúndez & van Soest, 1997
 Tethya seychellensis (Wright, 1881)
 Tethya simi Sarà, Bavestrello & Calcinai, 2000
 Tethya socius Sarà, Gómez & Sarà, 2001
 Tethya solangeae Ribeiro & Muricy, 2011
 Tethya sollasi Bergquist & Kelly-Borges, 1991
 Tethya songakensis Kim & Sim, 2005
 Tethya stellagrandis (Dendy, 1916)
 Tethya stellodermis Sarà & Sarà, 2004
 Tethya stolonifera Bergquist & Kelly-Borges, 1991
 Tethya strongylata Sarà, Bavestrello & Calcinai, 2000
 Tethya taboga (de Laubenfels, 1936)
 Tethya tasmaniae Sarà & Sarà, 2004
 Tethya tenuisclera Sarà & Corriero, 1994
 Tethya topsenti Sarà, Bavestrello & Calcinai, 2000
 Tethya uljinensis Shim & Sim, 2008
 Tethya vacua Austin, Ott, Reiswig, Romagosa & McDaniel, 2014
 Tethya varians Sarà & Bavestrello, 1998
 Tethya viridis (Baer, 1906)
 Tethya wilhelma Sarà, Sarà, Nickel & Brümmer, 2001

References

Hadromerida
Taxa named by Jean-Baptiste Lamarck
Taxa described in 1815